Alexander James Wähling (born 30 March 1995) is a German footballer who plays as a midfielder.

His younger brother Nicolas is also a footballer; their father is German and their mother is English.

References

External links
 Profile at DFB.de
 Profile at kicker.de

1995 births
Living people
Footballers from Las Palmas
German footballers
English footballers
German people of English descent
Association football midfielders
1. FSV Mainz 05 II players
People from Ludwigsburg
Sportspeople from Stuttgart (region)
3. Liga players
Footballers from Baden-Württemberg